Domoušice is a municipality and village in Louny District in the Ústí nad Labem Region of the Czech Republic. It has about 600 inhabitants.

Administrative parts
The village of Solopysky is an administrative part of Domoušice.

Geography
It lies in the Džbán geomorphological region. The Hasina stream springs here and flows across the municipality.

History
The area of the gord Na Rovinách was inhabited already in the prehistoric times. The first written mention of Domoušice is from 1325.

Transport
Domoušice lies on the railroad Rakovník–Most. There are two railway stations, Domoušice and Solopysky.

Domoušice is connected by two bus lines. A 3rd class road goes through Domoušice.

Sights
The Church of Saint Martin is a Baroque building from 1754.

The Domoušice Castle is a small rural Baroque mansion from the beginning of the 18th century. Today it is the seat of the forest administration.

Kounov stone series are ancient stone rows, which are often called the most mysterious place in the Czech Republic. They contain about 2,000 quartz stones, most often 80 cm in diameter, and run several hundred metres at irregular intervals from north to south in parallel rows. They are located on a raised plateau in the western part of the municipality and are named after the neighbouring village of Kounov.

Gallery

References

External links

Villages in Louny District